Ida Cole Haskell (April 24, 1861 – September 28, 1932) was an American painter and educator. She is known for her landscape and genre paintings. She taught painting at the Pratt Institute.

Biography
Haskell was born in 1861 in California. She studied art at the Art Institute of Chicago, the Art Students League of New York, the Pennsylvania Academy of the Fine Arts, and the Academie Julian in Paris. After living in several locations in the United States she  settled in New York to teach at the Pratt Institute. She lived with the photographer Alice Boughton.

Haskell was a member of the National Association of Women Painters and Sculptors.

Haskell exhibited her work at the Palace of Fine Arts at the 1893 World's Columbian Exposition in Chicago, Illinois.

Haskell died on September 28, 1932 in Brookhaven, New York.

Gallery

References

External links
 
images of Haskell's art on askART

1861 births
1932 deaths
American women painters
19th-century American women artists
20th-century American women artists
19th-century American painters
20th-century American painters
Painters from California
School of the Art Institute of Chicago alumni
Art Students League of New York alumni
Pennsylvania Academy of the Fine Arts alumni
Académie Julian alumni
Pratt Institute alumni